Leon Chang is an artist, musician, and prominent online personality associated with Weird Twitter, where he is known as @leyawn. In 2017, he released Bird World, an album designed as a soundtrack to a fake video game. In 2020, he released a sequel. His other works include an adventure game played through Twitter and a Vine user name generator.

References

External links 

 

American humorists
Artists from New York City
Musicians from New York City
Twitter accounts
Weird Twitter
Year of birth missing (living people)
Living people